Barbara Rittner (born 25 April 1973) is a German former professional tennis player. She currently is the captain of the German Fed Cup team. 
Her career-high singles ranking was No. 24 in the world, achieved on 1 February 1993.

As a junior, she won the 1991 Wimbledon Championships. She won her first WTA Tour title in 1992, and almost nine years later, she won her second at the Belgian Open in Antwerp. This marked the second longest time between singles titles in the Open Era (behind Marcie Louie, who captured her second title nine and half years after her first one). She also won three doubles titles with three different partners.

She reached the fourth round of a Grand Slam tournament twice in her professional career; once at the French Open in 1996, and again at the Australian Open in 2001. Her best performances at Wimbledon and the US Open are the third round in both.

At 's-Hertogenbosch in 2003, as a main-draw alternate, she recorded the best win of her career over the then-sixth ranked Amélie Mauresmo before losing to Kim Clijsters. Earlier in the year, she achieved her first career top-ten win over Jelena Dokić at Indian Wells.

In January 2005, she became captain of the German Fed Cup team.

WTA Tour career finals

Singles (2–3)

Doubles (3–10)

ITF finals

Singles (2–2)

Doubles (1–2)

External links

 
 
 
 
 
 

1973 births
Living people
German female tennis players
German tennis coaches
Olympic tennis players of Germany
Tennis players at the 1992 Summer Olympics
Sportspeople from Krefeld
Wimbledon junior champions
Grand Slam (tennis) champions in girls' singles
Grand Slam (tennis) champions in girls' doubles
West German female tennis players
Tennis people from North Rhine-Westphalia